Verte Island is a small rocky island  north of the Double Islands and  east of the tip of Zelee Glacier Tongue. It was photographed from the air by U.S. Navy Operation Highjump, 1946–47. It was charted by the French Antarctic Expedition, 1949–51, and so named by them because of its greenish appearance, "verte" being French for green.

See also 
 List of Antarctic and sub-Antarctic islands

Islands of Adélie Land